Knowle Mill, better known today as Bembridge Windmill, is a Grade I listed, preserved tower mill at Bembridge, Isle of Wight, England.

History

Bembridge Mill was built c. 1700. It was painted by Turner in 1795. The mill was working by wind until 1913, having only been used for grinding animal feed after 1897. The mill was restored in 1935 and again in 1959, the latter restoration being funded by public subscription. In 1962 the mill was taken over by the National Trust. It has been restored and is open to the public. New sails were fitted to the mill in March 2021.

Description

Bembridge Mill is a four-storey tower mill with a boat-shaped cap, which is winded by chain and wheel. It has four Common sails. The two pairs of millstones are driven underdrift.

Public access

Bembridge Windmill is open to the public between March and November, from 10:30 am to 5:00 pm daily. For more information please visit the National trust website.

References

External links

Bembridge Windmill – official page on National Trust website
Windmill World webpage on Bembridge Mill
 Turner's painting Tate Gallery

Industrial buildings completed in 1700
Windmills on the Isle of Wight
National Trust properties on the Isle of Wight
Tourist attractions on the Isle of Wight
Tower mills in the United Kingdom
Grinding mills in the United Kingdom
Grade I listed buildings on the Isle of Wight
Grade I listed windmills
Museums on the Isle of Wight
Mill museums in England
1700 establishments in England
Bembridge
Towers completed in 1700